The Salt Lake City Cemetery is in The Avenues neighborhood of Salt Lake City, Utah. Approximately 120,000 persons are buried in the cemetery. Many religious leaders and politicians, particularly many leaders of the Church of Jesus Christ of Latter-day Saints (LDS Church) lie in the cemetery. It is the largest city-operated cemetery in the United States.

Notable burials

A-G

H-P

R-Z

Notes

References

Further reading

External links 
 Official Site
 Cemeteries & Burials, Heritage.utah.gov
 Salt Lake City Cemetery at Find A Grave
 Cemeteries and Memorial Sites of Politicians in Salt Lake County, Utah, The Political Graveyard

 
Salt
Utah-related lists
Salt Lake City Cemetery